RPM was a Canadian magazine that published the best-performing singles of Canada from 1964 to 2000. During 1999, sixteen different songs reached number one. Canadian singer Alanis Morissette achieved the first number-one single of the year, "Thank U", while Italian group Eiffel 65 became the final musical act to peak at the top spot during the year with "Blue (Da Ba Dee)". Twelve of the sixteen chart-topping songs provided their performers with their first Canadian number-one single; only Alanis Morissette, Cher, Sugar Ray, and Madonna had previously topped the RPM Singles Chart. No artists peaked at number one with multiple singles during the year.

The longest-running number-one single of the year was Lou Bega's "Mambo No. 5 (A Little Bit Of...)", which spent 11 weeks at number one from 21 September to 29 November. The most successful song of the year was "Livin' la Vida Loca" by Ricky Martin, which topped the chart for eight weeks in late spring and early summer. Sugar Ray and Jennifer Lopez were the only other acts to spend at least five weeks at number one, while Cher, Sixpence None the Richer, and Eiffel 65 each stayed at number one for three weeks during 1999. Three Canadian acts earned a number-one single this year: Alanis Morissette, Barenaked Ladies, and Sky.

Chart history

Notes

See also
1999 in music

Canadian number-one albums of 1999
List of Billboard Hot 100 number ones of 1999 (United States)
List of number-one singles from the 1990s (New Zealand)

References

External links
 Read about RPM Magazine at the AV Trust
 Search RPM charts here at Library and Archives Canada

 
1999 record charts
1999